Heart of the City may refer to:

Music
 Heart of the City (album), a 1975 album by Barrabás
Heart of the City, an album by Dave Kelly
Heart of the City, an album by Tom Grant  
 Live...in the Heart of the City, an album by Whitesnake

Songs
"Heart of the City", a 1976 song by Nick Lowe, the B-side of "So It Goes"; covered by Dave Edmunds in 1978, and Dr. Feelgood in 1991
"Heart of the City", a 1986 song by Frank Mills
"Ain't No Love in the Heart of the City", a 1978 song covered as "Heart of the City" by Jay-Z

Other uses
 Heart of the City, Sheffield, an area in Sheffield, England
 Heart of the City (Kaliningrad), a redevelopment project in Kaliningrad, Russia
 Heart of the City (comic strip), a comic strip by Mark Tatulli and Christina 'Steenz' Stewart
 Heart of the City (TV series), a 1980s police procedural series
 Big Town or Heart of the City, a 1950s television series
Heart of the City (Bu Sehir Arkandan Gelecek), a 2017 Turkish drama.